, Vision Airlines was offering scheduled or charter flights to the following destinations.  However, according to the airline’s website, Vision has now ceased all scheduled passenger services as an independent air carrier.

Destinations
All flights operating under the Vision Airlines brand were public charters for Travelspan.

Guyana 

Georgetown (Cheddi Jagan International Airport)

Trinidad and Tobago 

Port of Spain (Piarco International Airport)

United States

New York 
New York (John F. Kennedy International Airport)

Terminated destinations

A number of these destinations were served on a scheduled basis from the former Vision Airlines hub located at the Northwest Florida Regional Airport (VPS) near Fort Walton Beach, FL and Destin, FL.  This hub operation was shut down in 2012.  The airline also operated charter flights between Las Vegas and the Grand Canyon National Park Airport (GCN).

United States

Alabama
Huntsville (Huntsville International Airport)

Arizona
 Grand Canyon (Grand Canyon National Park Airport)

Florida
Fort Lauderdale (Fort Lauderdale–Hollywood International Airport)
Fort Walton Beach (Northwest Florida Regional Airport) - Former hub
Miami (Miami International Airport)
Orlando (Orlando Sanford International Airport)
Punta Gorda (Punta Gorda Airport)
St. Petersburg (St. Petersburg–Clearwater International Airport)

Georgia 
Atlanta (Hartsfield–Jackson Atlanta International Airport)
Savannah (Savannah/Hilton Head International Airport)

Illinois
Champaign (University of Illinois Willard Airport)
Springfield (Abraham Lincoln Capital Airport

Indiana
Indianapolis (Indianapolis International Airport)

Kentucky 
Cincinnati (Cincinnati/Northern Kentucky International Airport)
Louisville (Louisville International Airport

Louisiana
Baton Rouge (Baton Rouge Metropolitan Airport)
Lafayette (Lafayette Regional Airport)

Maryland
Baltimore (Baltimore–Washington International Airport)

Mississippi 
Gulfport (Gulfport-Biloxi International Airport)

Missouri
St. Louis (St. Louis Lambert International Airport)

Nevada
 Las Vegas (North Las Vegas Airport and McCarran International Airport)

North Carolina
Asheville (Asheville Regional Airport)
Raleigh/Durham (Raleigh–Durham International Airport)

New York 
Niagara Falls (Niagara Falls International Airport)

Ohio 
Cleveland (Cleveland Hopkins International Airport)
Columbus (Rickenbacker International Airport)
Toledo (Toledo Express Airport)

South Carolina
Columbia (Columbia Metropolitan Airport)
Greer (Greenville-Spartanburg International Airport)
Myrtle Beach (Myrtle Beach International Airport) - Former focus destination

Tennessee
Chattanooga (Chattanooga Metropolitan Airport)
Nashville (Nashville International Airport)

Virginia
Richmond (Richmond International Airport)

West Virginia
Clarksburg (North Central West Virginia Airport)

Bahamas 

 Freeport (Grand Bahama International Airport) - Former focus destination

References

Lists of airline destinations